Cardiff North West was a parliamentary constituency in Cardiff, Wales.  It returned one Member of Parliament (MP)  to the House of Commons of the Parliament of the United Kingdom.

The constituency was created for the February 1974 general election, and abolished for the 1983 general election.

Boundaries
The County Borough of Cardiff wards of Gabalfa, Llanishen, Rhiwbina, and Whitchurch.

Members of Parliament

Election results

Elections in the 1970s

References 

Politics of Cardiff
History of Glamorgan
Historic parliamentary constituencies in South Wales
Constituencies of the Parliament of the United Kingdom established in 1974
Constituencies of the Parliament of the United Kingdom disestablished in 1983